Akwasi Owusu-Ansah (born April 10, 1988) is a former American football cornerback in the National Football League (NFL) for the Dallas Cowboys, Jacksonville Jaguars, Oakland Raiders, and Detroit Lions. He also was a member of the Toronto Argonauts in the Canadian Football League (CFL). He was drafted in the fourth round of the 2010 NFL Draft by the Dallas Cowboys. He played college football at Indiana University of Pennsylvania.

Early years
Owusu-Ansah family comes from Ghana, West Africa. He attended Whetstone High School in Columbus, Ohio and graduated in 2006.

He left as the school's career leading rusher for yards and touchdowns. He also helped Whetstone to their first back-to-back winning seasons in over 10 years, while receiving All-Ohio Honorable Mention honors as a senior. He practiced basketball and track.

College career
Owusu-Ansah played college football for the IUP Crimson Hawks of NCAA Division II. He became a starter as a junior, when he registered eight interceptions, including seven in the last four games, and three against Gannon University. Prior to his senior season in 2009 he was ranked as the ninth-best cornerback in the nation, and the only non-Division I player in the top 18. During his senior season, he returned three punts and two kickoffs for touchdowns and ranked in the top 15 nationally for kick and punt return average yards. He set school records for punt return yards and average and kickoff return yards.

He was selected for the 2010 East-West Shrine Game, but could not participate due to a shoulder injury suffered during his senior season. He later underwent surgery performed by James Bradley, team doctor of the Pittsburgh Steelers, in March 2010. Just before the surgery, Owusu-Ansah participated in the Pro Day workout at Ohio State University, where he recorded the fastest 40-yard dash time. Following his senior season, he was selected first-team All-American by the American Football Coaches Association, second-team by the Associated Press and first-team All-PSAC for defense and special teams.

Upon being drafted, he was the seventh player selected from IUP, and the third-highest selection for the school after Jim Haslett in 1979 and Leander Jordan in 2000. He is a member of Omega Psi Phi fraternity, Gamma Mu chapter. He is frequently referred to as "Kwasi".

Professional career

Dallas Cowboys (first stint)
Although he was considered to be inexperienced coming from a small school background and was also recovering from a shoulder injury he suffered as a senior, Owusu-Ansah was selected by the Dallas Cowboys in the fourth round (126th overall) of the 2010 NFL Draft, because of his athletic measurables. In the process, the team passed on other defensive backs like Kam Chancellor, Kendrick Lewis, Nolan Carroll, Sherrick McManis and Reshad Jones. On July 19, he agreed to a four-year contract worth $2.24 million with the Cowboys.

As a rookie, he was moved between the safety and cornerback position, earning the job as the team's primary kickoff returner. He was placed on the injured reserve list on November 10, with an ankle injury, after playing in 7 games.

On September 3, 2011, Owusu-Ansah was released. He cleared waivers and signed to the practice squad on September 4. During the 2011 NFL season, the Cowboys started playing him at wide receiver in addition to safety. He was waived from the team on November 29.

Jacksonville Jaguars
On December 4, 2011, the Jacksonville Jaguars signed Owusu-Ansah to their practice squad. He was promoted to the active roster on December 6, after the Jaguars released tight end Fendi Onobun. He played in 4 games with 2 starts. He was released on May 7, 2012.

Dallas Cowboys (second stint)
The Dallas Cowboys claimed Owusu-Ansah off waivers on May 8, 2012. He was released during the final roster cuts on August 31.

Oakland Raiders
On September 19, 2012, he was signed to the Oakland Raiders practice squad. He was re-signed and released from the practice two additional times, until being waived on May 13, 2013.

New Orleans Saints
On July 23, 2013, Owusu-Ansah signed with the New Orleans Saints. He was cut on August 27.

Detroit Lions
On December 2, 2013, he was signed to the Detroit Lions practice squad. He was promoted to the active roster on December 27. He was released on May 12, 2014.

Los Angeles KISS
On December 23, 2014, he was assigned to the Los Angeles KISS of the Arena Football League but refused to report.

Toronto Argonauts
On May 21, 2015, Owusu-Ansah signed with the Toronto Argonauts of the Canadian Football League (CFL). He was named the starter at cornerback and finished the 2015 season having played in all 18 regular season games. He registered 40 tackles, 4 interceptions (one returned for a touchdown) and 2 special teams tackles in his first year in the CFL. 

In 2016, he played in just four games and had 10 tackles, after a pectoral injury ended his season early. 

On February 27, 2017, he was re-signed by the Argos. He posted 30 tackles and was a part of the Grey Cup championship team, that had a 27-24 win against the Calgary Stampeders on November 26. He wasn't re-signed after the season.

References

1988 births
Living people
Players of American football from Columbus, Ohio
Players of Canadian football from Columbus, Ohio
Whetstone High School (Columbus, Ohio) alumni
American football safeties
American football cornerbacks
Canadian football defensive backs
American players of Canadian football
Dallas Cowboys players
IUP Crimson Hawks football players
Detroit Lions players
Jacksonville Jaguars players
Toronto Argonauts players
American sportspeople of Ghanaian descent